Alexander Beaufort Meek (July 17, 1814 (Columbia, South Carolina) – November 1, 1865 (Columbus, Mississippi) was an American politician, lawyer, judge, and chess player. He also was a writer of historical and literary essays, and poetry. He served as Alabama's Attorney General in 1836.

Works
An Oration Delivered before the Society of the Alumni of the University of Alabama at its First Anniversary, December 17, 1836
The South West: Its History, Character, and Prospects: A Discourse for the Eighth Anniversary of the Erosophic Society of the University of Alabama, December 7, 1839, Tuscaloosa, C. B. Baldwin, Press, 1840, 40 p.
Americanism in Literature. An Oration before the Phi Kappa and Demosthenian Societies of the University of Georgia, at Athens, August 8, 1844, Charleston, Burges and James, printers, 1844, 39 p.
The Red Eagle: A Poem of the South, New York, D. Appleton & Company, 1855, 108 p.
Montgomery, Ala., The Paragon Press, 1914
Romantic Passages in Southwestern History: Including Orations, Sketches, and Essays, New York, Mobile, S.H. Goetzel & Company, 1857, 330 p.
Spartanburg, S.C. : Reprint Company, 1975
Songs and Poems of the South, New York  Mobile, Alabama: S. H. Goetzel & Company, 1857, 282 p.

References
 Online biography of Meek, by the state of Alabama
 The Red Eagle, A Poem of The South, at Books.Google.com

External links
 

1814 births
1865 deaths
American chess players
19th-century American poets
American male poets
Politicians from Columbia, South Carolina
Alabama Attorneys General
19th-century chess players
19th-century American male writers
19th-century American politicians
Lawyers from Columbia, South Carolina
19th-century American lawyers